The Pawtuckaway River is a  river in southeastern New Hampshire in the United States. It is a tributary of the Lamprey River, part of the Great Bay and Piscataqua River watershed leading to the Atlantic Ocean.

The river forms the south outlet of Pawtuckaway Lake, a  lake in the town of Nottingham, New Hampshire. The river travels southeast through a wooded valley, passing under New Hampshire Route 156, entering the town of Raymond briefly, then crossing into Epping, where it joins the Lamprey River near the village of West Epping.

See also

List of rivers of New Hampshire

References

Rivers of New Hampshire
Rivers of Rockingham County, New Hampshire
New Hampshire placenames of Native American origin